Ischnura prognata, the furtive forktail, is a species of narrow-winged damselfly in the family Coenagrionidae. It is found in North America.

The IUCN conservation status of Ischnura prognata is "LC", least concern, with no immediate threat to the species' survival. The population is stable.

References

Further reading

External links

 

Ischnura
Articles created by Qbugbot
Insects described in 1861